Garrett Zuercher is an American deaf actor, director, and playwright.

Deaf West Theatre
Big River (Broadway National Tour) - Huckleberry Finn (lead)

Television
 Law & Order: Criminal Intent (Tommy Kellerman), episode 6x18 Silencer

Filmography
 See What I'm Saying
 Eu & Tu (Stephen)

References

External links
 

American male deaf actors
Living people
1979 births